Rio Chamita is a tributary of the Rio Chama in the United States. The stream flows south from a source in Archuleta County, Colorado to a confluence with the Rio Chama in Rio Arriba County, New Mexico.

See also
 List of rivers of Colorado
 List of rivers of New Mexico

References

Rivers of Colorado
Rivers of Archuleta County, Colorado
Tributaries of the Rio Grande
Rivers of New Mexico
Rivers of Rio Arriba County, New Mexico